Tarmon or Termon may refer to:
 Termonn, land belonging to a monastery in Gaelic Ireland

Tarmon places in Ireland
 Tarmon, County Kerry
 Tarmonbarry, County Roscommon
 Tarmon, County Clare, see List of townlands in County Clare
 Tarmon, County Leitrim, see List of townlands in County Leitrim

Termon places in Ireland
 Termon, County Donegal
 Termon River, County Donegal
 Termonfeckin, County Louth
 Termon, County Cavan, see List of townlands in County Cavan
 Termon, County Clare, see List of townlands in County Clare
 Termon, County Galway, see List of townlands in County Galway
 Termon, County Mayo, see List of townlands in County Mayo
 Termon, County Roscommon, see List of townlands in County Roscommon

See also
 Tarmon Gai'don, battle in The Wheel of Time fantasy fiction series
 Tamron, a Japanese company manufacturing photographic lenses
 Tarmani, village in Iran